Superliga de Voleibol Masculina 2013–14 was the 50th (L) season since its establishment. The 2013–14 regular season started on October 12, 2013, and finished on March 29, 2014.

Championship playoffs began on 5 April. Starting with semifinals, the two semifinal winners will advance to the Final to fight for the championship title.

CAI Teruel became new league champions by defeating defending champion, Unicaja Almeria 3–2 in the Final.

Competition format 
11 teams played in a two-rounds format. Upon completion of regular season, the top four teams play Championship's playoffs, while the bottom team is relegated to Superliga 2.

During regular season, a win by 3–0 or 3–1 means 3 points to winner team, while a 3–2 win, 2 points for winner team & 1 for loser team.

Championship playoffs is played to best of 3 games.

2013–14 season teams

2013–14 regular season standings

Championship playoffs

All times are CEST, except for Canary Islands which is WEST.

Bracket
To best of three games.

Semifinals

Match 1

|}

Match 2

|}

Match 3

|}

Match 4

|}

Final

Match 1

|}

Match 2

|}

Match 3

|}

Match 4

|}

Match 5

|}

Final MVP: Víctor Viciana

Top scorers
(This statistics includes regular season and playoff matches.)

References

External links
Official website

2013 in volleyball
2014 in volleyball
Superliga de Voleibol Masculina 
2013 in Spanish sport  
2014 in Spanish sport